Pacific Jazz Records was a Los Angeles-based record company and label best known for cool jazz or West coast jazz. It was founded in 1952 by producer Richard Bock (1927–1988) and drummer Roy Harte (1924–2003). Harte, in 1954, also co-founded Nocturne Records with jazz bassist Harry Babasin (1921–1988).

Some of the musicians who recorded for Pacific Jazz included Chet Baker, Paul Desmond, Gerry Mulligan, Joe Pass, Gerald Wilson, the Jazz Crusaders, Don Ellis, Clare Fischer, Jim Hall, Groove Holmes, Les McCann, Wes Montgomery, and Art Pepper.

In 1957, Pacific Jazz Records changed its name to World Pacific Records to expand into a full-line label, with the Pacific Jazz label retained for jazz releases.

In 1958 Richard Bock and World Pacific were instrumental in introducing Indian traditional music to the West via Ravi Shankar, who also recorded for World Pacific.

Bock sold the label to Liberty Records in 1965, although he remained as an adviser until 1970. Liberty was merged into and discontinued by United Artists Records in 1971; UA in turn was bought by EMI in 1979. Mosaic reissued some Pacific Jazz material in the late 1980s, as did Blue Note when it gained control of the catalog in the 1990s.

Partial discography

Pacific Jazz Ten Inch LP series
Pacific Jazz released 20 10-inch LPs between 1953 and 1954 before the label moved to 12-inch albums in 1955

Pacific Jazz/World Pacific 1200 Twelve Inch LP Series
Commencing in 1955 a total of thirty-one 12 inch albums were released on the Pacific Jazz label before the name was changed to World Pacific.

Mark Four SeriesPacific Jazz Records Catalog: Mark IV seriest  accessed February 21, 2017
From 1956 to 1958 the Mark Four Series released twelve albums with the PJM prefix.

Pacific Jazz 10000/20000 Series
In 1960 a new series of Pacific Jazz was launched with the PJ prefix with initial catalogue numbers increasing numerically for the first 91 releases before the 10000 numbering system was put into effect.

World Pacific 1400 Twelve Inch LP Series
Commencing in 1960 the World Pacific label began releasing a range of world music recordings on the 1400 Series.

World Pacific 1800 Twelve Inch LP Series
From 1962 until 1970 the World Pacific label released a range of popular music recordings on their 1800 Series.

See also
 List of record labels

References

External links
 Pacific Jazz and World Pacific label discographies
 Pacific Jazz singles labels
 World Pacific singles labels
 World Pacific Jazz singles labels
 Pacific Jazz on the Internet Archive's Great 78 Project

Jazz record labels
Record labels based in California
Defunct record labels of the United States
Defunct companies based in Greater Los Angeles
Blue Note Records
EMI
Record labels established in 1952
Record labels disestablished in 1972
1952 establishments in California
1970s disestablishments in California
.
West Coast jazz